Januarius (Latin for "devoted to Janus") usually refers to St Januarius, bishop of Benevento or Naples.

Januarius may also refer to:

Months
 Januarius, the first month of the ancient Roman calendar
 January, the first month of the modern calendar

People
 Januarius, the nomen or Roman last name of the gens Januaria
 Januarius, bishop of Flumenpiscense in Mauretania
 Januarius of Heraclea, martyred with Felix (Jan. 7)
 St Januarius of Cordova, martyred with Faustus and Martialis (Oct. 13) 
 St Januarius of Rome:
 St Januarius ( 10 July 165), son of St Felicity and one of the 7 Holy Brothers, martyr 
 St Januarius the Deacon ( 6 August 258), martyred with Pope Sixtus II and his five other deacons
 Januarius, bishop of Lambaese in Roman Numidia
 Januarius, bishop of Muzuca
 St Januarius ( 29 October 298), son of Marcellus, martyred in Spain with his family
 St Januarius of Zaragoza, sometimes listed among the 18 Martyrs of Zaragoza ( 16 April 303)
 Januarius ( 24 October 303), martyred with SS Felix, Audactus, Fortunatus, & Septimus
 St Januarius of Torres ( 304), martyred with SS Gavinus and Protus on Sardinia
 St Januarius of Nicopolis in Armenia, martyred with St Pelagia
 Januarius, bishop of Jericho present at Nicaea
 Januarius or Januarius II, bishop of Benevento
 Januarius I, bishop of Aquae in Mauretania
 Januarius, bishop of Tunusuda
 Januarius, bishop of Lamasna
 Januarius, bishop of Cunculiana
 Januarius, bishop of Aptuca
 Januarius, bishop of Centuriona in Numidia
 Januarius, bishop of Nara in Byzacene
 Januarius, bishop of Libertina
 Januarius ( 444–447), bishop of Aquileia 
 Januarius, bishop of Marciana in Lycia
 Januarius, bishop of Leontopolis in Lower Egypt
 Januarius, bishop of Praeneste
 Januarius ( ), bishop of Rimini
 Januarius II, bishop of Aquae in Mauritania 
 Januarius, bishop of Centuriae in Numidia
 Januarius, bishop of Gauria
 Januarius, bishop of Jactera in Numidia
 Januarius, bishop of Nasbinca
 Januarius, bishop of Tagaste
 Januarius, bishop of Valesa
 Januarius (4th century), founding bishop of Viviers in France
 Januarius ( 505–515), bishop of Salona in Dalmatia
 Januarius, bishop of Vegeselae
 Januarius, bishop of Mascula
 Januarius, bishop of Cagliari on Sardinia & correspondent with Gregory the Great
 Januarius, bishop of Malaga
 Januarius, bishop of Gattia in Byzacene 
 Januarius, bishop of Bana in Byzacene 
 Januarius, bishop of Libertini in Africa 
 Januarius, bishop of Musti in Africa 
 Prince Januarius, Count of Caltagirone
 Januarius Gagliano
 Januarius Kyunosuke Hayasaka
 Januarius MacGahan
 Januarius Maria Sarnelli
 Januarius Zick

See also
 January, the anglicized form of Januarius
 Gennaro, the italicized form of Januarius
 Janus
 September 19, the Feast of St Januarius
 Catacombs of St Januarius in Naples
 Order of St Januarius, bestowed by the titular King of Naples, a member of the Spanish royal family